Xu Changsheng is a Chinese computer scientist. He is a professor at the Institute of Automation of the Chinese Academy of Sciences in Beijing and Executive Director of China-Singapore Institute of Digital Media. He was named a Fellow of the Institute of Electrical and Electronics Engineers (IEEE) in 2014 for his contributions to multimedia content analysis.

References

External links

Fellow Members of the IEEE
Living people
Chinese Academy of Sciences
Chinese computer scientists
Year of birth missing (living people)